American National Standard Pipe Thread standards, often called national pipe thread standards for short, are United States national technical standards for screw threads used on threaded pipes and pipe fittings. They include both tapered and straight thread series for various purposes, including rigidity, pressure-tight sealing, or both. The types are named with a full name and an abbreviation, such as NPT, NPS, NPTF, or NPSC.

MIP is an abbreviation for male iron pipe, and FIP is an abbreviation for female iron pipe.

Outside North America, some US pipe thread sizes are widely used, as well as many British Standard Pipe threads and ISO 7-1, 7-2, 228-1, and 228-2 threads.

Types
The various types are each named with an abbreviation and a full name, as follows:

Uses 
Threaded pipes can provide an effective seal for pipes transporting liquids, gases, steam, and hydraulic fluid.  These threads are now used in materials other than steel and brass, including PTFE, PVC, nylon, bronze, and cast iron.

The taper on NPT threads allows them to form a seal when torqued as the flanks of the threads compress against each other, as opposed to parallel/straight thread fittings or compression fittings in which the threads merely hold the pieces together and do not provide a seal. The various types of pipe threads are designed for use both with or without thread sealants, as particular applications demand. The sealants, where used, are typically thread seal tape thread sealant or a thread seal paste pipe dope (sometimes similar in composition to plumber's putty). 

Because the thread body is tapered, a larger diameter keeps compressing into a smaller diameter and finally forms a seal (no clearance remains between the crests and roots of the threads because of the taper). This means that NPT fittings should be burr-free and lubricated using a lubricant like lubricating paste or thread seal tape. The use of tape also helps to limit corrosion on the threads, which otherwise can make future disassembly nearly impossible.

Sizes smaller than  inch are occasionally used for compressed air, while sizes larger than 6 inches are often joined by other methods.

Specifications
NPT is defined by ANSI/ASME standard B1.20.1.

The taper rate for all NPT threads is 1 inch of diameter in 16 inches of length measured by the change of diameter (of the pipe thread) over distance of thread. The half-angle (between the taper surface and the axis of the pipe) is arctan() ≈ 1.7899° ≈ 1° 47′.

The standard for Nominal Pipe Size (often abbreviated NPS, which should not be confused with the abbreviation NPS for the straight thread form standard) is loosely related to the inside diameter of Schedule 40 series of sizes. Because of the pipe wall thickness of Schedule pipe, the actual diameter of the NPT threads is larger than the Nominal Pipe Size outside diameter, and considerably so for small sizes. Pipe of a given size in a different Schedule than Schedule 40 provides a different wall thickness while maintaining the same outside diameter and thread profile as Schedule 40. Thus the inside diameter of a given size of Schedule pipe differs from the Nominal Pipe Size, while outside diameters for a given nominal Schedule size are the same between Schedules.

Thread form 
National Pipe Thread series have the same 60° included angle as Sellers thread. On the other hand, for sealing capability, tapered (pressure-tight) threads have crest and root shapes that differ from Sellers. For example, the NPT has a crest width of 0.038 to 0.062 pitch, which is sharper than the 0.125 pitch of Sellers.

National pipe taper fuel (NPTF) 
National Pipe Taper Fuel (NPTF, also called Dryseal American National Standard Taper Pipe Thread, defined by ASME B1.20.3) is designed to provide a more leak-free seal without the use of PTFE tape (often referred to by the popular brand name "Teflon") or another sealant compound. NPTF threads have the same basic shape but with crest and root heights adjusted for an interference fit, eliminating the spiral leakage path.

Standard sizes

History

In 1864, William Sellers, then president of Franklin Institute, presented a standard for nuts, bolts, and screws. Out of this effort came the first United States Standard threads, including pipe threads.

See also

 AN thread
 British Standard Pipe
 Fire hose thread
 Garden hose thread
 Gender of connectors and fasteners
 Panzergewinde
 Thread angle
 Threaded pipe

References

Bibliography

External links
 NPT Pipe Thread Dimensions
 ASME B1.20.-1983 Pipe Threads, General Purpose, Inch 
 NPT Taper Pipe Threads

Thread standards
Piping
Plumbing
Standards of the United States

ru:Трубная резьба